Nicholas Easton (born June 16, 1992) is an American football guard who is a free agent. Easton played college football for Harvard University. He has also been a member of the Baltimore Ravens, San Francisco 49ers, and Minnesota Vikings.

Early years
Easton played football at Hibriten High School in Lenoir, North Carolina, where he earned All-State honors, served as team captain his senior year and was twice named All-Conference and All-County. As a senior, he started as a center on the first undefeated regular season in school history. He was also a four-year American Field Service Club. Also a letterman in track & field, Easton was a conference and county champion in the discus, placing fourth in the regional championships with a throw of 41.15 meters (135 ft) as a senior.

College career
Easton attended Harvard University, where he played for the Harvard Crimson football team from 2010 to 2014. He did not play in any game as a true freshman in 2010. He played in 24 career games for Harvard and was a first-team All-Ivy League, BSN All-American, third-team FCS All-American and first-team FCS North All-American selection after starting all 10 contests as a senior in 2014.

As a sophomore in 2011, Easton appeared in four games; he was part of an offensive line unit that helped the Crimson earn an FCS No. 2 ranking in scoring offense, tallying 374 points (37.4 avg) and 51 total touchdowns. He helped pave the way for running back Treavor Scales to rush for career highs in yards, with 847 and touchdowns with 8.

Easton did not participate on the football team in 2012.

As a junior in 2013, Easton saw action in 10 games, earning All-Ivy League first-team honors, College Sports Madness All-Ivy second-team and FCS All-New England team honors. Harvard's offensive line achieved an FCS Top 10 ranking for team passing efficiency (7th overall) and allowed quarterback Conner Hempel to throw for a career-high 157 completions, 1,866 yards and 15 touchdowns.

Easton was a first-team All-Ivy League, fourth-team, BSN All-American, third-team FCS All-American and first-team FCS North All-American selection after starting all 10 contests as a senior in 2014. He also earned Academic All-Ivy League honors after majoring in economics. He was part of a Crimson offensive line unit that protected quarterback Scott Hosch, allowing him to set career highs in attempts, completions, passing yards and touchdowns en route to a perfect 10-0 season. He helped pave the way for running back Paul Stanton to rush for a career-high 990 yards on 147 attempts and 11 touchdowns.

Professional career

Pre-draft

Baltimore Ravens
Easton signed with the Baltimore Ravens as a rookie free agent on May 7, 2015. He was one of the team’s most consistent players during the preseason, earning the Ravens’ top overall grade (+9.1) from Pro Football Focus. His grade from PFF was also the highest of any center in the preseason and the seventh-best grade of any position player in the NFL.

San Francisco 49ers
On September 5, 2015, Easton was acquired by the San Francisco 49ers from Baltimore in exchange for a conditional seventh-round selection in the 2016 NFL Draft.

Minnesota Vikings
On October 6, 2015, the 49ers traded Easton and a 2016 sixth-round pick to the Minnesota Vikings in exchange for linebacker Gerald Hodges.

Easton made his first-career start in place of starting center Joe Berger in Week 13 of the 2016 season against the Dallas Cowboys. The following week, Easton again filled in for Berger for the second straight game after the veteran was unable to clear the concussion protocol.

Easton earned himself a starting guard spot for the Vikings in 2017, starting 12 games at left guard before suffering a fractured right ankle in Week 16. He was placed on injured reserve on December 26, 2017.

On August 13, 2018, Easton was placed on injured reserve after suffering a neck injury in training camp.

New Orleans Saints
On March 17, 2019, Easton signed a four-year $24 million contract with the New Orleans Saints to be their starting center after Max Unger retired.

On January 9, 2021, Easton was placed on injured reserve. He was released by the Saints on February 12, 2021.

References

External links
Harvard Crimson football bio

1992 births
Living people
Players of American football from North Carolina
People from Lenoir, North Carolina
American football centers
Harvard Crimson football players
Baltimore Ravens players
San Francisco 49ers players
Minnesota Vikings players
New Orleans Saints players